Hans Zollner (14 November 1929 – 2005) was an Austrian ice hockey player. He competed in the men's tournament at the 1956 Winter Olympics.

References

1929 births
2005 deaths
Austrian ice hockey players
Olympic ice hockey players of Austria
Ice hockey players at the 1956 Winter Olympics
Sportspeople from Klagenfurt